Mitogen-activated protein kinase 12 (MAP kinase 12), also known as extracellular signal-regulated kinase 6 (ERK6) or stress-activated protein kinase 3 (SAPK3), is an enzyme that in humans is encoded by the MAPK12 gene.

Function 

Activation of members of the mitogen-activated protein kinase family is a major mechanism for transduction of extracellular signals. Stress-activated protein kinases are one subclass of MAP kinases. The protein encoded by this gene functions as a signal transducer during differentiation of myoblasts to myotubes.

References

Further reading

EC 2.7.11
Protein kinases